The Second Mate is a 1928 British silent adventure film directed by J. Steven Edwards and starring David Dunbar, Cecil Barry and Lorna Duveen. It was made at Isleworth Studios as a quota quickie.

Premise
A ship is rescued by the Captain's daughter.

Cast
 David Dunbar as Jack Arkwright  
 Cecil Barry as Captain Bywater  
 Lorna Duveen as Ivy Bywater  
 Eric Hales as Captain Petrie

References

Bibliography
 Chibnall, Steve. Quota Quickies: The Birth of the British 'B' film. British Film Institute, 2007.
 Wood, Linda. British Films, 1927-1939. British Film Institute, 1986.

External links

1928 films
British adventure films
British silent feature films
1928 adventure films
1920s English-language films
Films shot at Isleworth Studios
Films based on British novels
Seafaring films
British black-and-white films
Silent adventure films
1920s British films